North Dakota Highway 1806 (ND 1806) is a state highway in the U.S. state of North Dakota. ND 1806 and ND 1804 were named to reflect the years of Lewis and Clark's travels through the area, and run along the southwest and northeast sides of the Missouri River, respectively. ND 1806 consists of four separate segments, running along Lake Sakakawea and the Missouri River in McKenzie, Dunn, Mercer, Oliver, Morton, and Sioux Counties.

Within the Standing Rock Indian Reservation in Sioux County, ND 1806 forms the northern segment of the Native American Scenic Byway, a national scenic byway. Other sections of the highway are known as part of the Lewis and Clark Trail.

Route description
The westernmost segment begins east of Watford City on North Dakota Highway 23, and runs north its northern terminus at the Tobacco Gardens Recreation Area on the southern shore of Lake Sakakawea.  The next segment of ND 1806 begins a few miles east-southeast of Tobacco Gardens and heads east before turning south and passing through Charlson.  The southern end of this segment also ends at ND 23.  The third segment runs east–west, and begins at ND 8 between Halliday and Twin Buttes.  This segment parallels the southern shore of Lake Sakakawea before ending at ND 200 southwest of Pick City.  The fourth and final segment of ND 1806 is largely north–south, with its northern end near the Oliver-Morton county border north of Mandan and Harmon. The highway intersects Interstate 94 and passes through downtown Mandan before following the Missouri River south through Morton County and onto the Standing Rock Indian Reservation.  The highway is concurrent with North Dakota Highway 24 for much of its length in Sioux County, and breaks with Highway 24 north of the North Dakota/South Dakota border.  After entering South Dakota, the highway continues as South Dakota Highway 1806.

History

In October 2016, protest activity on the Standing Rock Indian  Reservation related to the Dakota Access Pipeline caused the highway to be shut down indefinitely between ND 24 and Fort Rice by the Morton County Sheriff's Department. The Backwater Bridge on ND 1806 served as the site of conflict between protesters and law enforcement, with protesters barricading themselves on the bridge and burning cars.

Major intersections

Sioux–Morton segment

Lake Sakakawea segment

Charlson segment

Tobacco Gardens segment

References

1806
Transportation in Dunn County, North Dakota
Transportation in McKenzie County, North Dakota
Transportation in Mercer County, North Dakota
Transportation in Morton County, North Dakota
Transportation in Oliver County, North Dakota
Transportation in Sioux County, North Dakota